Head on a Green Sofa is an oil painting by Lucian Freud executed in 1960-1961. It is a portrait of the late Lady Lambton, wife of Antony Lambton, Viscount Lambton, 6th Earl of Durham. It was sold at  Sotheby's, London, 12 February 2014 by its then owner Edward Lambton, 7th Earl of Durham, for £2,994,500.

Citations

Bibliography
 Lawrence Gowing. Lucian Freud, London 1982, p. 121, no. 95, illustrated.
 Exhibition Catalogue, Rome, Palazzo Ruspoli, Lucian Freud: Dipinti e opera su carta 1940-1991, 1991, p. 22, illustrated.
 Robert Hughes, Lucian Freud Paintings, London 1993, p. 22, illustrated in colour.
 Bruce Bernard and Derek Birdsall, Eds. Lucian Freud, London 1996, no. 96, illustrated in colour.

1961 paintings
Paintings by Lucian Freud
Portraits of women